Postal services in New Zealand have existed since at least 1831, when the Postmaster-General of New South Wales deputed a Bay of Islands merchant to receive and return mail. Governor William Hobson issued an ordinance covering postal matters, although the British government retained control until 1848.

In these initial years, only a small number of post offices were established. Postal services expanded greatly from the mid-1850s, with the Local Posts Act of 1856 allowing Provincial Governments to establish post offices, and the Post Office Act of 1858, which re-organized postal services under a Postmaster-General.

The New Zealand Post Office continued to operate as a government department until 1987, when postal services were re-organized as New Zealand Post, a state-owned enterprise.
 
Postage stamps have been issued in New Zealand since around 18 to 20 July 1855 with the "Chalon head" stamps figuring Queen Victoria. The design was based on a full face portrait of the Queen in her state robes at the time of her coronation in 1837, by Alfred Edward Chalon. The stamps were initially hand cut from sheets, but from 1862 on, these sheets started being fed through automatic perforating machines. The Chalon heads were used until 1874 when the lithographed sideface stamps in various designs replaced them.

Universal one penny postage 

On 1 January 1901, New Zealand introduced one penny universal postage from New Zealand to any country in the world willing to deliver them. Australia, the United States, France and Germany would not accept such letters, fearful of having to reduce their own postal charges to match. This also halved the cost of mailing letters within New Zealand.

While concern was expressed that Post Office revenues would fall, mail volumes increased sharply and by 1902 any losses had been recovered.

First stamp vending machine 
New Zealand was the first country in the world to prototype and install stamp vending machines; one was installed in the General Post Office, Wellington in 1905.

Postal stationery 

The first items of postal stationery to be issued by New Zealand were postcards on 1 November 1876. The next items of postal stationery to be issued were newspaper wrappers on 1 April 1878. Lettercards were first issued on 1 January 1895, registered envelopes on 21 June 1898, envelopes on 4 June 1899 and air letter sheets or aerogrammes on 17 November 1941.

Deregulation 
The postal system in New Zealand was deregulated on 1 April 1998, meaning several different independent mail companies now exist. But in practice the state-owned NZ Post still delivers nearly all letters.

Other carriers 
Independent New Zealand post companies which issue their own stamps include DX Mail, Fastway Post, New Zealand Mail and Petes Post.

See also 
 Health stamp
 List of people on stamps of New Zealand
 Postage stamps and postal history of the Ross Dependency
 Revenue stamps of New Zealand
 Postage stamps and postal history of Australia
 New Zealand Philatelic Federation

References

Sources
 Campbell Paterson Ltd: Loose Leaf Catalogue of New Zealand Stamps.
 Encyclopaedia of Postal Authorities
 Laurie Franks: All the Stamps of New Zealand.

 Robin Gwynn: Collecting New Zealand Stamps.
 Plate reconstructing by Roly Runciman.
 Stanley Gibbons Ltd: various catalogues.
Rossiter, Stuart; Flower, John. The Stamp Atlas. London: Macdonald, 1986.

External links 

 Australia and New Zealand Revenue and Railway Fee Stamp Catalogue.
 Current and Upcoming NZ Post Issues
 Further information on the Penny Universal Stamp Issue
 Historical Issues, from NZ Post
 Register of Postal Operators
 New Zealand Stamp Images
 New Zealand Society of Great Britain

Postal system of New Zealand
History of New Zealand
Philately of New Zealand